is a high school in Japan, located in Tokyo. It was founded in 1920 as a high school affiliated to Waseda University.

Notable alumni

Politicians
Hirotaka Akamatsu
Tanzan Ishibashi
Tadahiko Ito
Akira Kazami
Yōhei Kōno
Noboru Takeshita
Kensuke Miyazaki
Yukio Aoshima

Businessmen
Nobuyuki Idei
Masaru Ibuka
Yusaku Maezawa

Academics
Fukui Fumimasa
Tomio Hora

Writers
Tatsuzō Ishikawa
Kosuke Gomi
Hidemitsu Tanaka
Fumio Niwa
Yoshinaga Fujita
Ashihei Hino
Mitsuharu Kaneko
Yoshiki Hayama
Isamu Yoshii
Aizu Yaichi
Santōka Taneda

Actors
Takeshi Kato
Masahiko Tsugawa
Hisaya Morishige

Musicians
Hachidai Nakamura
Satoshi Tomiie

Filmmakers
Takeshi Furusawa
Satsuo Yamamoto
Sōjirō Motoki

Athletes
Kisshomaru Ueshiba
Onishi Tetsunosuke
Taizo Kawamoto
Takashi Kondo
Jiro Sato
Katsuo Takaishi
Atsushi Tani
Akira Fujita
Tadao Horie
Tōru Mori

Others
Hajime Takano, journalist
Oki Sato, architect
Daisuke Nanba, assassin
Fumihiro Joyu, Aum Shinrikyo spokesperson
Kenichi Hirose, Aum Shinrikyo affiliate

Related books
 早稲田大学高等学院編『三十周年記念誌 : 1979』(Japanese), published in 1980
 早稲田大学高等学院編『継承そして創造 : 五十年の軌跡-未来に向けて』 (Japanese), published in 1999
 早稲田大学高等学院米式蹴球部OB会編『半世紀の道のり : 早稲田大学高等学院米式蹴球部50年史』(Japanese), published in 2000

External links

 Waseda University Senior High School

High schools in Tokyo
Boys' schools in Japan
Educational institutions established in 1920
Private schools in Japan
Waseda University
1920 establishments in Japan